Ernie Barbarash is a film director, screenwriter and producer, perhaps best known as co-producer of the films American Psycho 2, Cube 2: Hypercube, Prisoner of Love, The First 9½ Weeks and The Cat's Meow. Barbarash also wrote and directed Cube Zero and Stir of Echoes: The Homecoming. He also directed the Canadian horror thriller They Wait.

Filmography

Director 
 Cube Zero (2004)
Stir of Echoes: The Homecoming (2007)
 They Wait (2007)
 Hardwired (2009)
 Rock the House (2010)
 Ticking Clock (2011)
 Assassination Games (2011)
 Six Bullets (2012)
 Second Chances (2013)
 Reading Writing & Romance (2013)
 Falcon Rising (2014)
 Pound of Flesh (2015)
 The Saint (2017)
 A Royal Winter (2017)
 Christmas Inheritance (2017)
 Abduction (2019)
 Holiday in the Wild (2019)
 Christmas in Rome (2019)
 Too Close for Christmas (2020)
 The Great Christmas Switch (2021)
 Heatwave (2022)

Producer 
The Incredible Adventures of Marco Polo on His Journeys to the Ends of the Earth (1998) (co-producer)
The First 9 1/2 Weeks (1998) (co-producer)
Prisoner of Love (1999) (producer)
American Psycho (2000) (co-producer)
The Cat's Meow (2001) (co-producer)
American Psycho II: All American Girl (2002) (producer)
Cube 2: Hypercube (2002) (producer) 
Cube Zero (2004) (executive producer)

Writer 
Cube 2: Hypercube (2002) (screenplay)
Cube Zero (2004) (written by)
Stir of Echoes: The Homecoming (2007) (written by)

References

External links 
 
 

American film directors
Living people
Year of birth missing (living people)